Vathypetro is an archaeological site, four kilometres south of the town of Archanes on Crete (Greece). It contains some of the oldest wine presses in the world. Excavations began in 1949 by the Greek archaeologist Spyridon Marinatos. The estate contains a manor house or villa which had a prominent role in the rural region around Archanes. The complex consists of several buildings, courtyards and workshop spaces. Next to the individual houses is the Minoan wine press (wine press), a plant for the production of olive, a Minoan kiln and ceramics, and the remains of an ancient pottery workshop.

References

External links
 http://www.minoancrete.com/vathypetro.htm

Heraklion (regional unit)
Minoan sites in Crete
Populated places in ancient Greece
Former populated places in Greece
Greek wine